Lukavica is a village and municipality of the Bardejov District in the Prešov Region of Slovakia.

References

External links
 

Villages and municipalities in Bardejov District
Šariš